Patrik Pilloni (born 21 February 1970) is an Austrian ice hockey player. He competed in the men's tournament at the 1998 Winter Olympics.

Career statistics

Regular season and playoffs

International

References

1970 births
Living people
Olympic ice hockey players of Austria
Ice hockey players at the 1998 Winter Olympics
Sportspeople from Klagenfurt